Ostrovsky District is the name of several administrative and municipal districts in Russia:
Ostrovsky District, Kostroma Oblast, an administrative and municipal district of Kostroma Oblast
Ostrovsky District, Pskov Oblast, an administrative and municipal district of Pskov Oblast

See also
Ostrovsky (disambiguation)

References